The National Awards of Trinidad and Tobago consist of:

 The Order of the Republic of Trinidad and Tobago - the country's highest award.
 The Trinity Cross - the country's highest award until 2006.
 The Chaconia Medal of the Order of the Trinity - in Gold, Silver or Bronze
 The Hummingbird Medal of the Order of the Trinity - in Gold, Silver and Bronze
 The Public Service Medal of Merit of the Order of the Trinity - in Gold, Silver and Bronze
 The Medal for the Development of Women of the Order of the Trinity - in Gold, Silver and Bronze

Holders of the various awards are allowed to use the postnominal letters O.R.T.T. (Order of the Republic of Trinidad and Tobago), T.C. (Trinity Cross), C.M. (Chaconia Medal), H.B.M. (Hummingbird Medal) or M.O.M. (Medal of Merit).

These awards were introduced following independence in 1962 to replace the Imperial royal honours available to citizens of the British Empire.  They were approved in 1967 and first awarded in 1969.

The cabinet accepted the decision made by the national awards designs Selection Committee, which selected the designs submitted by the following persons:

1. Ms Wilhelmina McDowell, who designed the Trinity Cross

2. Mrs A. Jardine, who designed the Chaconia Medal
and

3. The designers of Messrs Y. DeLima and Co. Limited, who conceptualised the Hummingbird Medal.

4. Mr Ebenezer Edwards designed the Public Service Medal of Merit

Some of the winners who won medals in past years are listed below:

2016 awards

Chaconia Medal 
 Prof. Dave Chadee [posthumous] - Entomologist and Parasitologist, for science (Gold)
 Prof. Andrew Jupiter  - Former Permanent Secretary/Chairman of the Board of the Petroleum Company of Trinidad and Tobago and Director of the National Gas Company, for public service (Gold)
 Ramesh Lutchmedial - Former Director General of Civil Aviation, for public service (Gold)
 Grace Angela Talma - Management Consultant, for community service (Gold)
 William McKenzie - Former Minority Leader of the Tobago House of Assembly, for public service  (Gold)
 Winston Riley - Civil Engineer, for engineering (Gold)
 Winston Rudder - Retired Permanent Secretary, for public service (Gold)
 Justin Paul - Retired Permanent Secretary, for public service and education (Gold)
 Leston Paul - Musician/arranger/composer, for culture (Silver)

Hummingbird Medal 
 Irwin "Scrunter" Johnson - Calypso (Gold)
 Timothy Watkins ("Baron") - Calypso (Gold)
 Angelo Bissessarsingh - History and education (Gold)
 Cornelius Lewis - activist, for community service (Gold)
 Brenda Le Maitre - Matron/Registered Nurse, for community service  (Gold)
 St. Margaret's Boys’ Anglican School Youth Steel Orchestra, for culture  (Gold)
 Dr. Waffie Mohammed – Educator, for community service (Gold)
 Jerry Baptiste - Police Sergeant, for community service (Silver)
 Bibi Hallim - Retired Facilitator, for community service (Silver)
 Austin Wilson [posthumous] - Retired sound engineer, for culture) (Silver)
 Deborah De Rosia - Educator/ Community activist, for community service and education (Silver)
 Anstey Lumen Payne (Silver)
 Kenneth Paulsingh - Community activist, for community service (Silver)
 Keith Campbell [posthumous] - Fireman, for gallantry  (Bronze)

Public Service Medal of Merit 
 Angella Jack  (Gold)
 Jacqueline Wilson (Gold)
 Dr. Rohit Doon - Medical Doctor  (Gold)
  Mr. William Wilberforce Daniel - Chartered certified accountant  (Gold)
 Dr. Vincent Gerald Moe - Retired Permanent Secretary  (Gold)
 Ms. Margaret Wright – Retired Registered Nurse  (Gold)
 Iverne Ebenezer Yearwood [posthumous] - Former medical public service social worker (Silver)

Medal For The Development Of Women (Gold) 
 Monica Rosalind Williams - Retired Director, Gender Affairs
 Angela Martin - journalist [posthumous]

2015 awards

Order of the Republic of Trinidad and Tobago 
 Errol McLeod
 Winston Dookeran

Chaconia Medal 
 Daphne Bartlett - businesswoman (Gold)
 Selby Wilson - Telecommunications Authority chairman and former Finance Minister (Gold)
 Reynold Cooper - retired Head of the Public Service (Gold)
 Victor Mouttet - businessman  (Gold)

Hummingbird Medal 
 Dil-e-Nadan (Gold)
 Harrypersad Maharaj - President of the Inter- religious Organisation (IRO), for community service (Gold)
 Nobel Khan - former President of the IRO, for community service (Gold)
 Fred “Composer” Mitchell - calypso  (Silver)
 Kelwyn Hutcheon - calypso (Silver)
 Andrew “Lord Superior” Marcano - calypso (Silver)
 Anthony “All Rounder” Hendrickson  - calypso (Silver)
 Sharlene Flores - parang singer (Silver)
 Sherman Maynard [posthumous] - Policeman, for loyal service (Bronze)
 Kal-el Alleyne - 4 year old, for bravery
 Fernando Smith - soldier, for bravery
 Edric Hargreaves - Coast Guard, for bravery

2014 awards

Chaconia Medal 
 Michael Ronald Als – Trade unionist/community activist (Silver) [posthumous]
 Rudolph Charles (Silver) [posthumous]
 Velma Jardine - Educator (Bronze)

Hummingbird Medal 
 John Gillespie – architect (Silver)

2013 awards

Order of the Republic of Trinidad and Tobago 
 Justice Ivor Archie
 Makandal Daaga

Chaconia Medal 
 Jehue Gordon (Gold)

Hummingbird Medal 
 Ramesh Maharaj (Gold)
 John Jaglal (Silver)

2012 awards

Order of the Republic of Trinidad and Tobago 
 Keshorn Walcott

Chaconia Medal 
 Therese Mills (Gold)
 Selwyn Ryan (Gold)
 Swami Prakashananda (Gold)

Hummingbird Medal 
 Ade Alleyne-Forte (Gold)
 Keston Bledman (Gold)
 Marc Burns (Gold)
 Emmanuel Callender (Gold)
 Lalonde Gordon (Gold)
 Deon Lendore (Gold)
 Jarrin Solomon (Gold)
 Richard Thompson (Gold)
 Peter Elias
 Liam Teague (Silver)

2011 awards

Order of the Republic of Trinidad and Tobago 
 Ulric Cross

Chaconia Medal 
 Desmond Allum (Silver) [posthumous]
 Susan Craig-Jones (Silver)

Hummingbird Medal 
 Denyse Plummer (Gold)

Medal for the Development of Women 
 Hazel Brown
 Brenda Gopeesingh
 Diana Mahabir-Wyatt

2010 awards

Order of the Republic of Trinidad and Tobago 
 Karl Hudson-Phillips, QC
 Kamaluddin Mohammed

Chaconia Medal 
 Brian Mac Farlane (Gold)
 Julian Kenny (Gold)
 Margaret Elcock – broadcaster (Silver)

Hummingbird Medal 
Harripersad Dass - Chairman (Silver)

2009 awards

Order of the Republic of Trinidad and Tobago 
 Jizelle Salandy

Chaconia Medal 
 Dr. Geraldine Roxanne Connor – ethnomusicologist (Gold)
 Dr. Cuthbert Joseph (Gold)
 Len "Boogsie" Sharpe (Gold)

Hummingbird Medal 
 Alvin Corneal (Silver)

2008 awards

Order of the Republic of Trinidad and Tobago 
 Brian Copeland - Professor
 Bertram “Bertie” Lloyd Marshall, steelpan innovator
 Anthony Williams, steelpan innovator

Chaconia Medal 
 Aaron Armstrong (Gold)
 Keston Bledman (Gold)
 Marc Burns (Gold)
 Emmanuel Callender (Gold)
 Bernard Dulal-Whiteway (Gold)
 Richard Thompson (Gold)
 Meiling Esau (Silver)

2007 awards

Chaconia Medal 
 Kenneth Gordon (Gold)
 Jizelle Salandy (Gold)

Hummingbird Medal 
 Gerard Besson (Gold)
 Knolly Clarke (Gold)
 Daren Ganga (Gold)

2006 awards

Trinity Cross 
 none awarded

Chaconia Medal 
The 2006 World Cup squad and management (Gold)
Ivee Pendo
Sherie Leen Surla
Roda Andrade
Haide Esparrago
Marvin Andrews
Chris Birchall
Atiba Charles
Ian Cox
Carlos Edwards
Cornell Glen
Cyd Gray
Shaka Hislop
Clayton Ince
Kelvin Jack
Avery John
Stern John
Kenwyne Jones
Russell Latapy
Dennis Lawrence 
Collin Samuel
Brent Sancho
Jason Scotland
Densill Theobald
Aurtis Whitley
Evans Wise
Anthony Wolfe
Dwight Yorke
Leo Beenhakker (coach)
Professor David Picou MD (Gold)
Professor Hubert Daisley (Gold)
Glenn Erwin Tucker (Gold) 
William Laurence Chen (Silver)

Hummingbird Medal 
Anetta Archer (Gold)
Feroza Rose Mohammed (Gold)
Indi-Art Orchestra Musical Orchestra (Gold)
Soroptimist International of Port-of-Spain (Gold)
The Toco Foundation Organisation (Gold)
Elizabeth Helena Percy (Silver), (posthumous)
Cousilla Persad (Silver) 
Carlton Phillip (Silver) 
Ralph St Clair Davies (Silver)
Kelvin Guy Choy Aming (Silver)
Gary Straker's Pan School Organisation (Silver)
Edwin Joseph Skinner (Silver)
Dudnath Ramkeesoon (Silver)
Renny Quow, sprinter (Silver)
Rhonda Watkins (Silver)

Public Service Medal of Merit 
Deosaran Jagroo (Gold)
Andrew Llewellyn Tyson (Gold) (posthumous)
Carol Clark (Gold) 
Victoria Mendez-Charles (Gold) 
Paula Hazel-Dawn Daniel (Gold) 
Jagdeo Maharaj (Gold) 
Valerie Minnie Foster (Silver) (posthumous) 
Irma Sanowar (Silver)

2005 awards

Trinity Cross 
Edwin Carrington, Caricom Secretary General

Chaconia Medal 
Keith Chiang Awong (Gold)
Prof Andrew Madan Ramroop (Gold)
Justice Lionel Jones (Gold)
Dr Aleem Mohammed (Gold)
Carol Keller (Gold)
Bertille St Clair, football manager (Silver)
Francis Mungroo (Silver)
Rudranath Indarsingh (Silver)
Edward Henry Sealey (Silver)

Hummingbird Medal 
Noble Douglas (Gold)
Elise Joseph (Gold)
Edward Beharry (Gold)
John Frankie Asche (Gold)
Sedley Joseph (Gold)
Trinidad Steel Percussion Orchestra (Gold)
Heeralal Rampartap (Silver)
Wayne Naranjit (posthumous) (Silver)
Molly Boxhill (Silver)
Bill Trotman (Silver)
Kirk Fakira (Silver)
Michael Marcellin (Silver)
Alix Archer De Silva (Silver)
Peter Samuel (Silver)
Ria Ramnarine (Silver)

Public Service Medal of Merit 
Yolande Gooding (Gold)
Sr Petronella Joseph (Gold)
Hyacinth McDowall (Gold)
Ahmed Ali (Gold)
Annette Alfred (Gold)
John Antoine (Gold)
J. David Ramkeesoon (Gold)
Nature Seekers (Gold)
MOMS for Literacy (Caribbean) (Gold)
Mother's Union Children's Home (Gold)
Louise Angelina Mc Intosh (Gold)
Myra Catherine Greaves (Silver)
Daisy Maria James McClean (Silver)
Gloria Elizabeth Nurse (Silver)

2004 awards

Trinity Cross 
 none awarded

Chaconia Medal 
 Stephen Ames (Gold)
 Arthur Lok Jack (Gold)
 Zadia Rajnauth (Gold)
 Sarah Whiteman (Gold)
 Malcolm Jones (Gold)
 Joan Massiah (Gold)
 George Bovell, Olympic swimmer (Gold)
 Fenrick De Four (posthumous) (Silver)
 Malick Folk Performing Company, Dance Company (Silver)
 Clico Shiv Shakti Dance Company, Dance Company (Silver)

Hummingbird Medal 
 Cynthia Bell (Gold)
 Alyson Brown (Gold)
 Roy Cape (Gold)
 Barnabas Ramon-Fortune (Gold)
 Felix Roach (Gold)
 The WR Torres Foundation for the Blind (Gold)
 Edward Williams (posthumous) (Gold)
 Jacqueline Koon How (Gold)
 Veera Bhajan (Silver)
 Vishwanath Arjoon (Silver)
 Raj Karan Jadoo (Silver)
 Emmanuel Juman (Silver)
 The Lara Brothers Parang Group (Silver)
 Albert "Al" Ramsawack (Silver)
 Chandardath Sookram (Silver)
 Rhonda Charles (Silver)

Medal of Merit 
 Joseph Allard (Gold)
 Cislyn Baptiste (Gold)
 Pamella Benson (Gold)
 Carl de Souza (posthumous) (Gold)
 Kenneth Phillip (Gold)
 Frank Porter (Gold)

2003 Awards

Trinity Cross 
 Ken Julien

Chaconia Medal 
 André Tanker (Gold) (posthumously)
Exodus Steel Orchestra (Gold)
 Robert Riley (Gold)

Hummingbird Medal 
 George Bovell (Gold)
 Winston Bailey ("Shadow") (Silver)
 Jean Talma (Silver)
 Wayne Crooks (Silver)

Medal of Merit 
 Shireen Dewan-Mc Ken (Silver)

2002 awards

Trinity Cross 
 The Right Honourable Dr Eric Eustace Williams (posthumous)

Chaconia Medal (Gold) 
 Prof. Hylton McFarlance
 Professor Thomas Ainsworth Harewood 
 Trevor Michael Boopsingh
 Arthur Reginald Roberts (posthumous)

2001 awards

Chaconia Medal (Gold) 
 Vindar Rabindrath Dean-Maharaj
 Dr Iqbal Mohammed
 Dr Rajandaye Ramkissoon-Chen
 Mr Colin Laird

2000 awards

Trinity Cross 
 Archbishop Anthony Pantin [posthumous]

Chaconia Medal (Gold) 
 Annette Des Isles
 Dr Neville Jankey 
 Courtney Andrew Walsh
 Patrick Brennan Burke
 Professor Harrinath D. Maharaj
 Dr Norbert Masson

1999 awards

Trinity Cross 
 Dr Henry Wesley Moulton Collymore MBBS, FRCS
 Chief Eleazar Chukwuemeka Anyaoku, Con Adazie of Obosi, Ogwumba of Idemili (Honorary)

Chaconia Medal (Gold) 
 Justice Zainool Hosein
 Trevor A. Lee, SC
 Dwight Yorke, footballer
 Lawrence Duprey
 Dr Tim Dhanraj Gopeesingh

1998 awards

Trinity Cross 
 Bowles, Sylvan ]posthumous]

Chaconia Medal (Gold) 
 Sharma, Justice Satnarine (Mr)
 Ibrahim, Justice Mustapha (Mr)
 Fitzwilliam, Wendy (Miss)
 Sabga, Anthony Norman (Mr)

1997 awards

Trinity Cross 
 Robinson, Arthur N. R. (His Excellency)

Chaconia Medal (Gold) 
 Boldon, Ato Jabari (Mr), athlete
 Davis, James Anthony (Hon. Mr Justice)
 Gopeesingh, Lloyd Balraj (Hon. Mr Justice) [posthumous]
 Hubah, Clarence Evans (Dr), MBE
 Lalla, Kenneth Ramsanta (Mr), SC
 Thomas, Christopher Roy (Mr), Ambassador
 Tim Pow, Ainsley Vincent Maurice (Mr)

1996 awards

Trinity Cross 
 De la Bastide, Michael Anthony (Mr)
 Minshall, Peter (Mr), Carnival artist

Chaconia Medal (Gold) 
 Andrews, John Peter (Mr)
 Gomez, Gerald Ethridge (Mr) [posthumous]
 Petrotrin Invaders Steel Orchestra
 Pierre, Lennox Oscar (Mr) [posthumous]
 Queen's Park Cricket Club
 Ramchand, Kenneth (Professor)

1995 awards

Trinity Cross 
 Bishop, Patricia Alison (Miss), HBM
 Pantin, Gerard Arthur (Fr), C.S.Sp.

Chaconia Medal (Gold) 
 Alcantara, Joyce Angela (Miss)
 Furness-Smith, John Gerald (Mr), SC
 Ramadhin, Sonny (Mr), cricketer
 Selvon, Samuel Dickson (Mr), writer [posthumous]

Public Service Medal of Merit (Silver) 
 Browne, Elaine Lenora

1994 awards

Trinity Cross 
 Lara, Brian (Mr), international cricketer

Chaconia Medal (Gold) 
 Bobb, Euric (Dr) - Ph.D.
 De Leon "Roaring Lion", Rafael (Mr)
 Pitt-Miller, Phyllis Leonora (Dr)

1993 awards

Trinity Cross 
 Hassanali, Noor M. (His Excellency)
 Walcott, Derek (Mr) (Honorary), writer

Chaconia Medal (Gold) 
 Barrow, Russell William (Dr)
 Barsotti, Frank Andral (Mr) - M.A. Cantab
 Francisco "Mighty Sparrow", Slinger (Mr), calypsonian
 James, Alphonso Philbert Theophilus (Mr) [posthumous]
 Jorsling, Mc Donald Phillip (Mr)
 Roopnarinesingh, Syam Sundar (Professor)
 Sawh, Lall Ramnath (Dr)

1992 awards

Chaconia Medal (Gold) 
 Addo, Edward Adotey (Dr)
 AMOCO Renegades Steel Orchestra
 Griffith, Elton George (The Most Reverend His Grace Dr) 
 Henry, Mervyn Ulrick (Dr)
 John, Selwyn Alfred (Mr)
 Marshall, Bertie Lloyd (Mr)
 Murray, Lance Esme Hamilton (Mr)
 Vyas, Ramdath (Pundit)
 WITCO Desperadoes Steel Orchestra
 Wong Sang, Joyce Angela (Mrs)

1991 awards

Trinity Cross 
 The Regiment of the Trinidad and Tobago Defence Force
 The Trinidad and Tobago Police Service

Chaconia Medal (Gold) 
 Freeman, William E. (Mr) [posthumous], B.Sc. (Lond), A.R.C.S.
 Glean, Vernon (Mr)
 Knox, Wilfred Sidney (Mr)
 Media Association of Trinidad and Tobago
 Naraynsingh, Vijay (Dr)
 Neehall, John Edward (Dr)
 Norton, Noel Patrick (Mr)
 Richards, Rolf (Professor) 
 The Trinidad and Tobago Fire Service
 The Trinidad and Tobago Prison Service

Chaconia Medal (silver) 
Anand Yankarran (Mr) [Entertainer]

1990 awards

Chaconia Medal (Gold) 
 Aziz, Mohammed Ali (Dr) 
 Busby, George Oliver David (Dr)
 Campbell, Alton A. (Mr)
 Des Iles, Gerard Emmanuel (Hon. Mr Justice)
 Deyalsingh, Lennox (Hon. Mr Justice)
 Lai-Fook, Arthur E. (Rev. Fr)
 Mahase, Anna (Dr)
 Ratan, Premchand N. (Dr) 
 Sinanan, Ashford (Mr)

Hummingbird Medal (Gold) 
 Beddoes, Andrew
 Connor, Maurice
 Eckels, Juliet Mary
 Griffiths, Jason
 Hanoonmansingh, Hans
 Saidwan, Dean
 Sealey, Joslynne
 Taylor, Gretta Patricia

1989 awards

Trinity Cross 
 McBurnie, Beryl Eugenia (Dr), H.B.M.
 Naipaul, Vidia S. (Mr) - H.B.M.

Chaconia Medal (Gold) 
 Boswell-Inniss, Kathleen Sheila (Mrs)
 Capildeo, Simbhoonath (Mr)
 Ghouralal, Samuel (Dr)
 Ince, Winston Edghill (Dr)
 National football Team (Strike Squad)

Hummingbird Medal (Silver) 
 Marshall, Stanley Laurie (Mr) - Drama (Silver)

1988 awards

Trinity Cross 
 Demas, William Gilbert (Mr)
 Duprey, Cyril (Mr)

Chaconia Medal (Gold) 
Abidh, Stella (Dr)
 Hosein, Inayat (Mr)
 Lequay, Alloy (Mr)
 Lovelace, Earl (Mr)
 Narine, Ralph (Justice)
 Omah-Maharajh, Deonarayan (Dr), President General of the Sanatan Dharma Maha Sabha
 Sammy, George (Professor) [posthumous]
 Warner, Alcalde (Justice)

1987 awards

Public Service Gold Medal of Merit 
 Charles, Randolph T, Former Commissioner of Prisons Public Service

Trinity Cross 
 Bernard, Clinton (The Hon. Mr Justice)
 James, C. L. R. (Mr), historian
 Pan Trinbago
 Weekes, George (Mr)

Chaconia Medal (Gold) 
 Butler, Knolly (Professor)
 Byam, Neville (Dr)
 Carrington, Edwin (Sir), former Secretary-General of CARICOM
 Laronde, Giselle (Miss), beauty pageant titleholder
 Rambachand, Anand (Professor)
 Stewart, Leslie "Tiger" (Mr), boxer

Chaconia Medal (Silver) 
 Girdharie, Sohan
 Malloon, Grace Atteck
 Minshall, Peter
 Sharpe, Len (Boogsie)

1986 awards

Chaconia Medal (Gold) 
 Alleyne, Doddridge Henry Newton (Mr)
 Lewis, James O'Neil (Mr) (Awarded in 1974)
 Rampersad, Frank Budhoo (Mr)

1985 awards

Trinity Cross 
 Kelsick, Cecil (The Hon. Mr Justice)

Chaconia Medal (Gold) 
 Braithwaite, John (Mr)
 Seukeran, Lionel Frank (Mr)

1984 awards

Chaconia Medal (Gold) 
 Wooding, Hugh Arthur Selby (Mr)

1983 awards

Chaconia Medal (Gold) 
 Cross, Ulric, (Mr)
 Rees, Evan (Mr)
 Sosa, Thomas Gregorio (Mr)

1982 awards

Trinity Cross 
 Hosein, Tajmool (Mr)

Chaconia Medal (Gold) 
 Annisette, Emmanuel B. (Mr)
 Besson, Herman Alexander (Mr) [posthumous]
 Bramble, Cecil (Mr) [posthumous]
 Crichlow, Verna Mercedes (Mrs) [posthumous]
 Lewis, Anthony Clyde (Mr)
 Noel, Claude Benjamin (Mr)
 Pollonais, Rene Joseph (Mr)
 Richardson, Reginald Kenneth (Dr)

1981 awards

Trinity Cross 
 Teshea, Isabella (Mrs) [posthumous]

Chaconia Medal (Gold) 
 Corbin, Maurice (Mr)
 Date-Camps, Ada (Dr)
 Harnarayan, Percival (Mr)
 Kirton, Gertrude (Mrs)
 Padmore, Marjorie (Miss) [posthumous]
 Scott, Garvin (Mr)

1980 awards

Trinity Cross 
 Bruce, Victor (Mr) - H.B.M.
 Burroughs, Randolph (Mr), M.O.M.
 Gregoire, Errol (Mr)
 Williams, Mervyn (Commander), M.O.M.

Chaconia Medal (Gold) 
 Bonnett, Lionel (Mr), Chairman, Tobago County Council
 Chadee, Dalton (Mr), Former Alderman and Deputy Mayor of San Fernando Borough Council
 Mahabir, Bisram (Dr)
 Quamina, Elizabeth (Dr)
 Roopnarine, Errol (Mr) [posthumous]
 Scott, Winfield (Mr)
 Spence, John A. [Professor]
 Wilson, Oswald (Mr)

1979 awards

Trinity Cross 
 Montano, Gerard (Mr)
 Phillips, Clement Ewart Gladstone (Mr)
 Pierre, Eugenia Theodosia (Mrs), C.M.T., H.B.M.
 Sinanan, Mitra G. (Mr)

Chaconia Medal (Gold) 
 Blackman, Ingrid (Mrs)
 Burke-Browne, Angela (Mrs)
 Castagne, Patrick Stanislaus (Mr), composer
 Castanada, Peggy (Miss)
 Charleau, Heather (Miss)
 Charles, Cyrenia (Mrs)
 Dimsoy, Marcia (Miss)
 Gatcliffe, Thomas (Mr)
 Lutchman, Solomon (Mr) [posthumous]
 Nurse, Jennifer (Miss)
 Peters, Sherril (Mrs)
 Phelps, Harry Orville (Professor)
 Pierre, Eugenia Theodosia (Mrs)
 Prescod, Veryl (Miss)
 Sellier, Robert (Mr)
 Stollmeyer, Jeffrey (Mr), cricketer and footballer
 Thomas-Luces, Althea (Mrs)
 Williams, Jennifer (Miss)

1978 awards

Trinity Cross 
 Serrette, Joffre Charles Harold (Brigadier)
 Solomon, Patrick Vincent Joseph (Dr) 
 Wharton, Joseph Algernon (Mr), QC

Chaconia Medal (Gold) 
 Dolly, Reynold Cartright (Dr)
 Galt, Kenneth Victor (Mr) [posthumous]
 Garcia, Ignacio Adrian (Mr)
 Murray, Eric Hugh (Mr)
 Patrick, Alan Leslie (Dr)
 Rostant, Louis Gerald (Mr)
 Seemungal, Lionel Augustine (Mr), S.C., M.A., LL.B. (Cantab.)

1977 awards

Trinity Cross 
 Ali, Wahid (Dr)
 Amoroso, Emmanuel Ciprian (Professor)
 Commissiong, Janelle Penny (Miss), former beauty pageant titleholder
 Reece, Sir Alan

Chaconia Medal (Gold) 
 Bailey, Emmanuel McDonald (Mr), athlete
 Duprey, Cyril, OBE, businessman, founder of CLICO
 Ghany, Noor Mohammed (Mr)
 Holder, Joseph Hamiltion (Mr)
 Inglefield, Geoffrey Robert (Mr)
 Murray, Arthur (Mr)
 Richards, George Maxwell (Mr)

1976 awards

Trinity Cross 
 Crawford, Hasely Joachim
 Maingot, Rodney
 Pitt, David Thomas (Lord)
 Thomasos, Clytus Arnold

Chaconia Medal 
 Barcant, Malcolm (Gold)
 Beaubrun, Michael Herbert (Gold)
 Dieffenthaller, Raymond Edwin (Gold)
 McNish, Althea (Mrs John Weiss) (Gold)
 Reece, Erna (Gold)
 Ward, Joshua Emmanuel (Gold)
 Hingwan, Edwin (posthumous) (Silver)
 Melchor, M. NACION GOLD CROSS MEDAL P/C SOLDIER G,O.627

1975 awards

Chaconia Medal (Gold) 
 Bartholomew, Courtenay (Dr)
 Crichlow, Nathaniel (Senator) - trade unionist
 Dymally, Mervyn (Senator)
 Henry, Zin (Dr)
 Hudson-Phillips, Henry, QC
 Lloyd, Clive, CBE, AO - West Indies cricketer (Honorary)
 Murray, Deryck (Mr)
 Poon King, Theodosius (Dr)
 Robinson, Sir Harold 
 Walls, Victor (Rev. Dr)

1974 awards

Public Service Gold Medal of Merit 
 Beard, Eugene Edwin
 Beckles, Agatha
 Bruno, Winzey Anthony
 Busby, Arthur Hamilton
 Clemendore, Anthony
 D'Abadie, Raymond Joseph
 Duncan, Vincent Gregory
 Hargreave, Evelyn Victoria
 Holder, George Ethelbert
 Kalloo, Emmanuel Nicholas
 McShine, Irene Umilta
 Maraj, James
 Mitchell, Lionel Paul
 Munroe, George
 Pyles, Oscar Emmanuel
 Sawyer, Olive Theodore
 Shepherd, Gertrude Enid
 Simon, Winston "Spree"
 Siung, Oswald Horace
 Smith, John Lyon 
 Telemaque, Harold Milton
 Thomasos, Theodora
 Wellington, Oswald Elrick

Chaconia Medal (Gold) 
 Blackman, Fitzgerald (Alderman) [posthumous]
 De la Bastide, Karl Phillipe De Jacques (Justice)
 Gibbs, Lance (Mr) (Honorary)
 Julien, Bernard (Mr)
 Kanhai, Rohan (Mr) (Honorary)
 Pierre, Joseph Henry (Sir)
 Rowe, Lawrence (Mr) (Honorary)
 Wattley, George Hippolyte (Dr)

1973 awards

Trinity Cross 
 La Borde, Charles Harold (Mr)
 La Borde, Mary Kwailan (Mrs)
 Boos, Werner James (Sir), CBE  [posthumous] 
 Hyatali, Isaac (The Honourable Sir)

Chaconia Medal (Gold) 
 Archbald-Crichlow, Beryl May (Mrs)
 Armoogam, George Victor (Mr)
 Atteck, Sybil (Miss)
 O'Connor, Quintin (Mr) [posthumous]
 Vaucrosson, Walter Ferdinand (Dr)
 Waite, Joan Teresa (Sister)

1972 awards

Trinity Cross 
 Archbald, Rupert Carlyle, QC
 Marcano, George Roderick (Dr)
 Sobers, Garfield St. Auburn, West Indies cricketer AO, OCC  - [Honorary]

Chaconia Medal (Gold) 
 Boucard, Dennis (Mr)
 Girwar, Norman (Mr)
 Mc Naughton-Jones, Cynthia (Mrs)

1971 awards

Trinity Cross 
 Barboza, Mario Gibson (Mr)
 Constantine, Learie (Baron) - [posthumous]
 Maurice, Julius Hamilton (Mr)
 Mc Shine, Arthur Hugh (Sir) - Kt. Bach.

Chaconia Medal (Gold) 
 Francis, Aldwin Gerard (Dr)
 Hoyte, Ralph Allan St. Clair (Dr)
 Johnstone, Helen May (Mrs) - CBE
 Julien, Kenneth (Professor)
 Julien, Mark Thomas Inskip (Senator)
 Lewis, Leon Ferdinand Earle (Dr)

1970 awards

Trinity Cross 
 Tubal Uriah Butler (Mr), labour leader
 Donald C. Granado (His Excellency)
 George Richards QC

Chaconia Medal (Gold) 
 Wilfred D. Best (Mr)
 Edwin Lee Lum (Mr)
 Grant E. Pilgrim (Mr)
 Elbert Robertson (Dr)
 David A. Wyke (Dr)

Chaconia Medal (Silver) 

 Lystra Charles
 Stephen Moosai-Maharaj
 Clive Spencer

Chaconia Medal (Bronze) 

 Eileen Douglas-Shaw
 Talbot Paul

Hummingbird Medal (Gold) 

 Wesley Hall
 Vidia S. Naipaul
 Jankie Persad Sharma

Hummingbird Medal (Silver) 

 Allan Aaron
 Henry Archer
 Allan Carr
 Errol Dickerson
 Clement A. Moonsammy
 Jocelyn Pierre
 Kelvin "Mighty Duke" Pope
 Stephanie Scipio-Pollard

Hummingbird Medal (Bronze) 

 Neville Jules
 Narsaloo Ramaya
 Kathleen "Auntie Kay" Warner

Public Service Medal of Merit (Gold) 

 George L. Bowen
 Joffre Serrette

Public Service Medal of Merit (Silver) 

 Cyril Barnes
 David Bloom
 Keith Brathwaite
 Clebert Grayson
 Marjorie Guy
 Claud Anthony May
 Eric Mc Carthy
 Ignatius Mc Phillip
 David Munro
 Victor Noel
 Wallace Pedro
 Ernest Pierre
 Victor Rique
 Louis J. Rodriguez
 Enos Sewlal
 Julian A. Spencer
 Evelyn Tracey
 Leslie Oliver Weekes
 Mervyn Williams

Public Service Medal of Merit (Bronze) 

 Aubrey Adams
 William Charles
 Hubert Cox
 Franklyn De Gale
 Fitz James Demas
 Hansley Greaves
 Oscar Joseph
 Sieunarine Maraj
 Francis Rigaud
 Percival Roach
 Ethelbert Sorzano
 Evans Cornelius Wilson

1969 awards

Trinity Cross 
 Rudranath Capildeo (Dr)
 Ellis Clarke (Sir), CMG, QC
 Solomon Hochoy (His Excellency Sir), GCMG, GCVO, OBE
 Finbar Ryan (His Excellency Count), OP, (former Archbishop of Port of Spain)
 Hugh Wooding (The Right Honourable Sir), PC, CBE, QC

Chaconia Medal (Gold) 
 Lloyd Brathwaite (Professor)
 Leonard Joseph Graf (Reverend Father)
 Kenneth Lindsay Grant (Sir), OBE
 John A. V. Harper (Mr) [posthumous]
 Audrey Jeffers (Miss) [posthumous]
 Karoo Ojah Maharaj (Pundit) MBE
 Louis Anselm Halsey Mc Shine CBE
 James A. Waterman (Dr) OBE

Chaconia Medal (Silver) 
 George Bowen
 Margaret Bynoe
 Harry Joseph
 Ralph Kelshall
 Cevella Niki McBride
 Cleopatra Romilly

Hummingbird Medal (Gold) 
 Winifred Atwell
 Victor Bruce
 Andrew Carr 
 William Demas
 Hugh Harris
 Ralph James
 Beryl McBurnie
 Carlyle Missette
 Samuel Selvon
 Derek Walcott [Honorary]
 Olivia Walke M.B.E.
 William Williams

Hummingbird Medal (Silver) 
 George Baileye – carnival bandleader
 Carlisle Chang
 Margaret Cowie
 Slinger "Mighty Sparrow" Francisco
 Roger Gibbon
 Ellie Mannette 
 Aldwyn Roberts

Hummingbird Medal (Bronze) 
 Ken Morris
 Krishna Persad
 Edwin Roberts
 Anthony Williams

Public Service Medal of Merit (Gold) 
 M. P. Alladin
 Randolph Burroughs
 Stanely Johnson
 Mathieu Lee Sing
 Sylvester Nicholas
 Carlton Ottley
 James P. Reid

Public Service Medal of Merit (Silver) 

 Norbert Brown
 Helen De Verteuil MBE
 Reginald V. Hogan
 Eric James MBE
 Lystra Lewis MBE
 Fitz G. Maynard
 James Mc Donald
 George Mose
 Marjorie Padmore
 Sydney Ramdial
 Mary M. Scandella
 Sydney Turpin
 Raymond Watkins
 Willoughby Weekes
 Charles F. Worme

Constitutional controversy

On 17 April 2008 the Cabinet agreed that the name of the highest national award should be The Order of the Republic of Trinidad and Tobago, that the name of the Society to replace the Order of the Trinity should be The Distinguished Society of Trinidad and Tobago, that the highest national award should be re-designed so as to replace the Cross with a Medal and that the Letters Patent should be amended to give effect to those decisions.

Subsequently, in Sanatan Dharma Maha Sabha of Trinidad and Tobago Inc & Ors v Attorney General of Trinidad and Tobago [2009] UKPC 17 (28 April 2009) the Judicial Committee of the Privy Council in London, on appeal from the Court of Appeal of Trinidad and Tobago, held that the creation of the Trinity Cross of the Order of the Trinity breached the constitutional rights of non-Christians to equality and to freedom of conscience and belief. However, the council also made a declaration that the judgment should not have retrospective effect: "nothing in this judgment should be taken to apply to any awards of this high honour that were made under the system that the Letters Patent established before the date of the.. judgment." (per Lord Hope of Craighead at para 42).

References

External links

Privy Council judgment
National Awards

 
Trinidad and Tobago awards
Trinidad and Tobago and the Commonwealth of Nations